Gheorghe Man (born 20 March 1914, date of death unknown) was a Romanian fencer. He competed in the team sabre event at the 1936 Summer Olympics.

References

External links
 

1914 births
Year of death missing
Romanian male fencers
Romanian sabre fencers
Olympic fencers of Romania
Fencers at the 1936 Summer Olympics
20th-century Romanian people